Myripristis kochiensis is a species of fish in the family Holocentridae found in the Northwest Pacific

References

External links
 
 

kochiensis
Fish described in 1996